The Hayashi rearrangement is the chemical reaction of ortho-benzoylbenzoic acids catalyzed by sulfuric acid or phosphorus pentoxide.

This reaction proceeds through electrophilic acylium ion attack with a spiro intermediate.

References

Rearrangement reactions
Name reactions